The 1991 Minnesota Twins of Major League Baseball (MLB) won the World Series, the second time the Twins had won the World Series since moving to Minnesota in 1961. During the 1991 regular season the Twins had an MLB-leading 15-game win streak, which remains a club record. On June 17, 1991, the streak came to an end at the hands of the Baltimore Orioles but not before the Twins moved from fifth place to first, a lead they would not relinquish until winning baseball's championship. The Twins' winning streak of 1991 falls just seven games short of the all-time American League (AL) record of 22 consecutive regular season wins set by the Cleveland Indians in 2017. 

The Twins finished 95-67, first in the AL West, which represented a turnaround from 1990, when the team finished last in the division with a 74-88 record.  They were the first team to go from a last-place finish to a World Series championship.  They and the Atlanta Braves were the first teams to go from last place to a pennant.  The Twins defeated the Braves in seven games in a Series which has been considered one of the best to have ever been played.

There was a considerable reshaping of the team in January and February, beginning when third baseman Gary Gaetti left as a free agent on January 25 and signed with the California Angels.  Less than 12 hours after Gaetti's departure, the Twins signed free agent Mike Pagliarulo from the New York Yankees as a new third baseman.  Two more key free agent signings followed with designated hitter Chili Davis on January 30 and St. Paul native Jack Morris on February 5. The July 1989 blockbuster trade that sent 1988 AL Cy Young Award winner Frank Viola to the New York Mets in exchange for relief pitchers Rick Aguilera and David West and starter Kevin Tapani proved to be pivotal to the 1991 season. There were only seven players still on the roster from the 1987 World Championship team, none of them pitchers:  Randy Bush, Greg Gagne, Dan Gladden, Kent Hrbek, Gene Larkin, Al Newman, and future Hall of Famer Kirby Puckett.  Into this framework, young stars were blended successfully, including Scott Leius to platoon with Pagliarulo at third, Shane Mack in right field, Scott Erickson, a 20-game winner with a 12-game winning streak, and A.L. Rookie of the Year second baseman Chuck Knoblauch.

2,293,842 fans attended Twins games, the eighth highest total in the American League.

Offseason
December 2, 1990: Roy Smith was released by the Twins.
January 14, 1991: Tom Edens was signed by the Twins as a free agent.
January 25, 1991: Mike Pagliarulo was signed as a free agent by the Twins.
January 29, 1991: Chili Davis was signed as a free agent by the Twins.
February 5, 1991: Jack Morris was signed as a free agent by the Twins.

The club moved spring training operations from Orlando's Tinker Field, where the franchise had trained since 1936, to the Lee County Sports Complex in Ft. Myers.

Regular season

For the second time in his career, Kirby Puckett had a six-hit game on May 23.  This was an eleven-inning game; the previous time in 1987 was in nine innings.

The highest paid player on the team was Jack Morris at $3,700,000; followed by Kirby Puckett at $3,166,667.

Offense

Pitching

Jack Morris, Kevin Tapani, and Scott Erickson were a solid, 1-2-3 punch in the team's rotation.  The fourth and fifth spots were less certain, with Allan Anderson, David West, and Mark Guthrie starting over 10 games.  Rick Aguilera was a solid closer, earning 42 saves.

*League leader

Defense

The regular lineup included Kent Hrbek at first base, rookie Chuck Knoblauch at second, Greg Gagne at shortstop, Brian Harper at catcher, and Kirby Puckett, Shane Mack, and Dan Gladden in the outfield.  Mike Pagliarulo and Scott Leius platooned at third.  Junior Ortiz was the backup catcher, and Al Newman was a reliable utility infielder.

Season standings

Record vs. opponents

Roster

Notable transactions
April 2, 1991: Nelson Liriano was released by the Twins.
May 10, 1991: Carmelo Castillo was released by the Minnesota Twins.
June 3, 1991: 1991 Major League Baseball draft
David McCarty was drafted by the Twins in the 1st round (3rd pick).
Scott Stahoviak was drafted by the Twins in the 1st round (27th pick).
LaTroy Hawkins was drafted by the Twins in the 7th round.
Brad Radke was drafted by the Twins in the 8th round.
Matt Lawton was drafted by the Twins in the 13th round.
December 19, 1991: Brian Harper was signed as a free agent with the Minnesota Twins.

Player stats

Batting

Starters by position
Note: Pos = Position; G = Games played; AB = At bats; H = Hits; Avg. = Batting average; HR = Home runs; RBI = Runs batted in

Other batters
Note: G = Games played; AB = At bats; H = Hits; Avg. = Batting average; HR = Home runs; RBI = Runs batted in

Pitching

Starting pitchers
Note: G = Games pitched; IP = Innings pitched; W = Wins; L = Losses; ERA = Earned run average; SO = Strikeouts

Other pitchers
Note: G = Games pitched; IP = Innings pitched; W = Wins; L = Losses; ERA = Earned run average; SO = Strikeouts

Relief pitchers
Note: G = Games pitched; W = Wins; L = Losses; SV = Saves; ERA = Earned run average; SO = Strikeouts

Postseason
See 1991 American League Championship Series and 1991 World Series.

Seven players and five of the coaching staff from the 1987 World Champions repeated as 1991 World Champions.

Only one man has been a part of each of the three Minnesota Twins World Series teams: Tony Oliva.  An outfielder in 1965, he was the hitting coach on the 1987 team and bench coach in 1991.

Awards and honors
 Kent Hrbek, Lou Gehrig Award
 Jack Morris, Babe Ruth Award
 Jack Morris, World Series Most Valuable Player
 Kirby Puckett, ALCS Most Valuable Player
 Chuck Knoblauch, 1991 AL Rookie of the Year

All-Star Game
The Twins had three All-Stars in the 1991 All-Star Game: closer Rick Aguilera, pitcher Jack Morris, and center fielder Kirby Puckett.  Scott Erickson would have started the all-star game had he not been injured in a start at home against the Chicago White Sox in June.

Other post-season awards
Calvin R. Griffith Award (Most Valuable Twin) – Jack Morris
Joseph W. Haynes Award (Twins Pitcher of the Year) – Jack Morris
Bill Boni Award (Twins Outstanding Rookie) – Chuck Knoblauch
Charles O. Johnson Award (Most Improved Twin) – Shane Mack
Dick Siebert Award (Upper Midwest Player of the Year) – Jack Morris
The above awards are voted on by the Twin Cities chapter of the BBWAA
Sherry Robertson Award (Twins Outstanding Farm System Player) – Pat Mahomes

Farm system

LEAGUE CHAMPIONS: Orlando

References

External links
Player stats from www.baseball-reference.com
Team info from www.baseball-almanac.com
1991 Standings
Interview with Mike Pagliarulo About the 1991 Twins

Minnesota Twins seasons
Minnesota Twins
American League West champion seasons
American League champion seasons
World Series champion seasons
Twins